The men's individual was one of two events for men out of four total events in Archery at the 1988 Summer Olympics.

Summary

Preliminary round
Each archer shot a FITA round, consisting of 144 arrows split evenly between the distances of 90 metres, 70 metres, 50 metres, and 30 metres.  The top 24 archers advanced to the 1/8 finals.

The United States, winners of the men's gold medal every year they had competed, advanced all of their archers.  Korea also had all three archers qualify for the next round.  Finland, Japan, Great Britain, and the Soviet Union each had two archers advance.  All three medallists from 1984 moved on to the next round.

1/8 final
Each archer shot one quarter of a FITA round, with the 36 arrows split evenly between the distances of 90 metres, 70 metres, 50 metres, and 30 metres.  The top 18 archers advanced to the quarterfinal.

Korea and the United States again advanced all three archers.  Finland and Japan were the nations having two archers qualify.  The three medallists from 1984 continued to compete, though Darrell Pace of the United States, gold medallist in Los Angeles, only barely managed to take 18th place to advance.

Quarterfinal
Each archer shot one quarter of a FITA round, with the 36 arrows split evenly between the distances of 90 metres, 70 metres, 50 metres, and 30 metres.  The top 12 archers advanced to the semifinal.

Once again, the six Korean and American archers advanced, along with two Finnish archers.  Pace, who won gold four years earlier, sprang from near-elimination in the 1/8 final to first place in the quarterfinal.  It was bronze medal defender Hiroshi Yamamoto that barely escaped elimination in this round.

Semifinal
Each archer shot one quarter of a FITA round, with the 36 arrows split evenly between the distances of 90 metres, 70 metres, 50 metres, and 30 metres.  The top 8 archers advanced to the final.

One archer from each of the three nations with multiple archers fell in this round, leaving Korea and the United States with two archers advancing as Finland joined the Soviet Union, the Netherlands, and Japan in qualifying one archer for the final.  Pace, the defending gold medallist, missed the cut by one place.  Yamamoto, the defending silver medallist, avoided that fate by shooting two points better than Pace to place eighth.

Final
The top three archers in the final earned medals.  Each archer shot one quarter of a FITA round, with the 36 arrows split evenly between the distances of 90 metres, 70 metres, 50 metres, and 30 metres.

The United States and Korea, having vied for dominance throughout the competition, won a gold and silver medal, respectively.  This continued the American men's streak of winning a gold medal in every men's archery competition in which they had taken part.  The Soviet Union also earned a medal.  McKinney and Yamamoto, the remaining defending medallists, placed only 6th and 8th, respectively.

Results

References

External links
Official Olympic Report

Archery at the 1988 Summer Olympics
1988 in archery
Men's events at the 1988 Summer Olympics